Venterdon is a hamlet in Cornwall, England. It is a quarter of a mile from Stoke Climsland.

References

Hamlets in Cornwall